This article shows statistics of individual players for the football club F.C. Copenhagen. It also lists all matches that F.C. Copenhagen played in the 2015–16 season.

Players

Squad information
This section show the squad as currently, considering all players who are confirmedly moved in and out (see section Players in / out).

Squad stats

Players in / out

In

Out

Club

Coaching staff

Other information

Competitions

Overall

Danish Superliga

League table

Results summary

Results by round

UEFA Europa League

Second qualifying round

Third qualifying round

Results summary

Matches

Competitive

References

External links
 F.C. Copenhagen official website

2015–16
Danish football clubs 2015–16 season